"Sir Christèmas" (or Sir Christëmas) is a traditional British Christmas carol. The song's lyrics and melody are by an unknown author, with the first record of the song in the Ritson Manuscript, dating the song to some point before 1510.

Words
Unlike in modern English, "Christëmas" is pronounced in this carol with three syllables rather than two.

The following are the opening lyrics as attributed to Richard Smart, Rector of Plymtree, Devon between 1435 and 1477:

1
Nowell, Nowell, Nowell, Nowell,
’Who is there that singeth so?’
’I am here, Sir Christëmas.’
’Welcome, my lord Christëmas,
Welcome to us all, both more and less
Come near, Nowell!’

Arrangements

An early contemporary setting is that of the Australian composer Arthur Benjamin, published in 1941. His arrangement is for SATB without accompaniment.

An arrangement was made by the Welsh composer William Mathias in 1971 for SATB and organ/brass/orchestra. A further arrangement was penned by Thomas Yeakle in 1972 for SATB, harp and woodwind, advisedly a krummhorn.

In 1990, Derek Holman created an arrangement for sopranos and altos, flute, cello, harp, piano and optional percussion for the Canadian Children's Opera Chorus.

See also
 List of Christmas carols

References

Christmas carols
Santa Claus
Year of song unknown